is a railway station in Goshotaira in the village of Kawakami, Minamisaku District, Nagano Prefecture, Japan, operated by East Japan Railway Company (JR East).

Lines
Shinano-Kawakami Station is served by the Koumi Line and is 31.5 kilometers from the terminus of the line at Kobuchizawa Station.

Station layout
The station consists of one very narrow ground-level island platform serving two tracks, connected to the station building by a level crossing.  The station is unattended.

Platforms

History
Shinano-Kawakami Station opened on 16 January 1935.  With the privatization of Japanese National Railways (JNR) on 1 April 1987, the station came under the control of JR East. The current station building was completed in 2002.

Passenger statistics
In fiscal 2015, the station was used by an average of 110 passengers daily (boarding passengers only).

Gallery

Surrounding area
Chikuma River

See also
 List of railway stations in Japan

References

External links

 JR East station information 

Railway stations in Nagano Prefecture
Railway stations in Japan opened in 1935
Stations of East Japan Railway Company
Koumi Line
Kawakami, Nagano